In the Sinhalese language, it is almost all the time compulsory for the speaker or writer to observe the importance of the subject and the object of the sentence. Sinhalese uses a vast collection of honorifics to reflect the speaker's relationship with the subject and object of the sentence and it also reveals the level of importance the society or the writer has given to them. In the present stage of the language, honorifics are mostly used in the literary language than in the vernacular, and is being gradually limited to the use in formal occasions.

Noun Honorifics

Inanimate Nouns
When talking about an object that holds superiority or importance, or an object which has been given superior status, these honorifics are used. They can only be used in the literary language and play an essential part in Sinhala literature. Usually, the word is replaced by its "tatsama" counterpart for this, as in the word කෑම-kǣma (food) becomes the tatsama word භෝජන-bhōjana (food) just to emphasize the given importance. 
The honorifics හු-hu and ඕ-ō are usually used after this in plural form and the verb also is changed accordingly to its plural form, something that is not done to normal inanimate plurals. This changes the perspective of the object to the state the writer has given it, and thus advocates more beauty and grandeur to the sentence.

   Ex:තරු අහසේ දිදුලයි.
     tharu ahasē điđulayi.
     (the stars shine in the sky.) (singular)
     තාරකාවෝ අහසේ දිදුලති.
     thārakāwō ahasē điđulathi.
     (the stars[honorific] shine in the sky.) (plural)

When referring to the religious and holy objects or relics in Sinhala, the honorific වහන්සේ-wahansē is sometimes used.

   Ex:දළඳා වහන්සේ-đaļaňđā wahansē-the tooth relic of Lord Buddha.
      වෙහෙර වහන්සේ-wehera wahansē-the stupa.
         දෙවියන් වහන්සේ - Deviyan wahanse - God

Animate Nouns
A legion of honorifics are in use in the present Sinhala language to accentuate the social and ethical importance of the people the speaker or writer is addressing. Generally, elders, teachers, strangers, political/spiritual leaders, renowned people and customers in the Sinhala society are referred to with honorifics, while the younger people and students are not. The incorrect use of honorifics can lead to confusions, and are often thought as sarcastic remarks.

   Ex:When calling someone younger than you as ඔබ තුමා-oba thumā it can mean that you
      are sarcastic about the younger one's boastful and prejudiced attitude.

The most common honorifics in Sinhala language are වහන්සේ-wahansē (venerable), හාමුදුරුවෝ-hāmuđuruwō (monk/venerable), තෙමේ-themē (sir), තොමෝ-thomō (madam), මයා-mayā (Mr.), මිය-miya (Mrs.), ඕ-ō, හු-hu and දෑ-đǣ, with all of them joining at the end of a noun. The suffixes ආණ-āņa, අණු-aņu, අණි-aņi used at the end of elders' names in the literary language also add honor to the salutations. As a rule, when using those 3 animate honorifics, the verb is always changed to its plural form.

   Ex:පිය-piya+ආණ-āņa+ඕ-ō -පියාණෝ-piyāņō (father) 
      පියා ගෙදර එයි.-piyā geđara eyi.-(father comes home.)
      පියාණෝ ගෙදර එති.-piyāņō geđara ethi (father comes[come] home.)
      පුත්-puth+අණු-aņu+ඕ-ō -පුතණුවෝ-puthaņuwō(son) 
      පුතණුවෝ පාඩම් කරති.-puthaņuwō pādam karathi. (son studies[study].)
      හාමුදුරුවෝ බණ දෙසති.-hāmuđuruwō baņa đesathi. (venerable preach[es] a sermon.)

Verb Honorifics
Any verb in Sinhala can be converted into an honorific by simply changing it into its plural form. Ex:ගියේය-giyēya(went) into ගියහ-giyaha(went[plural]) However, when referring to a royal or a venerable, verbs are changed either into their unique honorific forms or their plural "tatsama" forms.

   Ex:හිමි-himi       +ඕ-ō         = හිමියෝ-himiyō (venerable monk)
      මම කෑම කෑවෙමි. -mama kǣma [kǣwemi] (I [ate] supper.) 
      හිමියෝ දන් වළඳති.-himiyō đan [waļaňđathi] (the monk [eats] supper.)
      හිමිවරු දන් වැළැඳූහ.-himiwaru đan [wæļæňđūha]. (monks [ate] supper.)

The words සේක-sēka and දෑය-đǣya are used at the end of the verbs in sentences beginning with the honorifics වහන්සේ-wahansē and දෑ-đǣ respectively.

In Address and Request
The honorific නි-ni can be seen on formal salutations and in works of literature. Usually it is adjoined with the addressing honorifics තුමා-thumā or තුමී-thumī Ex:දෙවියනි-đewiyani (my god), ගුරුතුමනි-guruthumani (dear teacher), රජතුමනි-rajathumani (my king)නේ-nē  is used when talking to give the same meaning:බුදුනේ-buđunē (my lord buddha), දෙවියනේ-đewiyanē (my god), ජේසුනි-Jesuni (my Jesus), අම්මේ-ammē (dear mother).

When requesting something to be done, මැනවි-mænawi is written at the end of a verb that is in order form. It is now only used in written works and historical plays.

    Ex:දෙන්න-đenna-give මැනවි-mænawi-request 
       දෙනුමැනවි-đenumænawi-(I) ask that (you) give.In the early colloquial Sinhala, the honorific suffix ņdi''' was used when addressing elder relatives and family members. After the colonial rule, these practices had been eventually abandoned.

   Ex:අම්මා-ammā (mother)        +ණ්ඩි-ņdi අම්මණ්ඩි-ammaņdi 
      අක්කා-akkā (elder sister) +ණ්ඩි-ņdi අක්කණ්ඩි-akkaņdi 
      අයියා-ayiyā (elder brother)+ණ්ඩි-ņdi අයියණ්ඩි-ayiyaņdi

See also
 Indian honorifics, many South and Southeast Asian honorifics derive from Indian influence
 Thai honorifics
 Thai royal ranks and titles
 Malay styles and titles
 Filipino styles and honorifics
 Indonesian honorifics
 Greater India
 Indosphere

References

Sinhala language
Honorifics by language